Jenő Hámori may refer to:

 Jenő Hámori (economist), Hungarian economist
 Jenő Hámori (fencer) (born 1928), Hungarian Olympic fencer